Eine für alle – Frauen können’s besser is a German television series.

See also
List of German television series

External links
 

2009 German television series debuts
2009 German television series endings
German-language television shows
Das Erste original programming